"Blister in the Sun" is a song by American rock band Violent Femmes, originally released on their 1983 self-titled debut album.

Background
"Blister in the Sun" was written by Violent Femmes vocalist Gordon Gano. The drum lick was written by Victor DeLorenzo; the song was his first performance with the band.

Gano originally wrote the song for a female vocalist.

Lyrics
The lyrics to "Blister in the Sun" reference drug use. After the song was released, a misinterpretation arose that the lyrics were about masturbation. In a 2013 interview with The Village Voice, Gano said:

Other versions and use in media
The song is featured in the 17th episode of teen drama series My So-Called Life.

The song was also featured prominently in the 1997 film Grosse Pointe Blank. John Cusack had initially requested an updated version of the song, which led to the band recording a new, slower arrangement that featured saxophones, strings and other instruments. This version of the song was dubbed "Blister 2000." However, Cusack eventually decided he wanted to include the original version of the song as well. Because the original master tapes of the band's debut album had long been disposed of, they decided to record a new version of the original 1983 arrangement. Neither of these rerecorded versions appears in the actual film, although a new music video, directed by Evan Bernard, was created for the new recording of the 1983 arrangement. It features Gordon Gano as a deranged assassin trying to kill Socks the cat in puppet form, interspersed with clips from the film.

A cover by mxmtoon is played in the 2021 video game Life Is Strange: True Colors.

In February 2021, the song was covered by drag queen and singer Trixie Mattel for her extended play Full Coverage, Vol. 1.

Legacy
In 2005, "Blister in the Sun" became the first English-language track to ever be allowed on RTÉ Raidió na Gaeltachta, the Republic of Ireland Irish-language radio station, after having been selected by listeners for the event.

In August 2007, Gordon Gano was the subject of a lawsuit brought by bassist Brian Ritchie, which stemmed partly from Gano's authorization of the use of "Blister" in a Wendy's commercial. This disagreement caused the band to disband until their reunion in 2013.

Notes

1983 debut singles
1983 songs
1997 singles
Slash Records singles
Songs about drugs
Songs written by Gordon Gano
Violent Femmes songs